FDT may refer to:

 "FDT" (song), by American rapper YG and featuring Nipsey Hussle
 Democratic Federation of Labour, a Moroccan trade union
 Democratic Front of Chad, a political party in Chad
 File descriptor table
 Flattened device tree
 Fluctuation-dissipation theorem
 Future-directed therapy, a form of psychotherapy
 Powerflasher FDT, a software application
 Thiesian Democratic Front, a political party in Senegal